Fibroid may refer to:

 Uterine fibroid or fibroid, a benign growth in the uterus composed of:
 Leiomyoma, a benign smooth muscle tumor that very rarely becomes cancer (0.1%)
 Fibroma or fibroid, a tumor of fibrous connective tissue usually found on the skin
 Inflammatory fibroid polyp, in the colon